Kristian Welch (born May 24, 1998) is an American football linebacker for the Baltimore Ravens of the National Football League (NFL). He was signed by the Ravens as an undrafted free agent in 2020 following his college football career at Iowa.

Professional career

Baltimore Ravens
Welch signed with the Baltimore Ravens as an undrafted free agent following the 2020 NFL Draft on May 6, 2020. He was waived during final roster cuts on September 5, 2020, and re-signed to the team's practice squad the next day. He was placed on the practice squad/injured list on September 15, and activated back to the practice squad on October 6, 2020 He was elevated to the active roster on October 17, 2020 and October 31, 2020 for the team's weeks 6 and 8 games against the Philadelphia Eagles and Pittsburgh Steelers, and reverted to the practice squad after each game. He was promoted to the active roster on November 7, 2020.

The Ravens placed an exclusive-rights free agent tender on Welch on March 10, 2021. He signed the one-year contract on April 18, 2021.

On March 9, 2022, the Ravens placed an exclusive-rights free agent tender on Welch.

References

External links
Baltimore Ravens bio
Iowa Hawkeyes football bio

1998 births
Living people
People from Iola, Wisconsin
Players of American football from Wisconsin
American football linebackers
Iowa Hawkeyes football players
Baltimore Ravens players